Herczeg is a Hungarian surname. Notable people with the surname include:

Ágnes Herczeg, Hungarian artist
András Herczeg (born 1956), Hungarian football manager and player
Ferenc Herczeg (1863–1954), Hungarian playwright and writer
István Herczeg (1887–1949), Hungarian gymnast
Iván Herczeg, Hungarian sprint canoeist
Miklós Herczeg (born 1974), Hungarian football player

See also
Ágnes Herczegh (born 1950), Hungarian discus thrower
Géza Herczegh, (1928-2010), Hungarian judge

Hungarian-language surnames